Father Marià Paieres i Borràs (Catalan), commonly known as Mariano Payeras Borrás or Padre Mariano Payeras (in Spanish) (Inca, Mallorca, Spain / October 10, 1769 – Lompoc, California, Mexico / April 28, 1823) was a Spanish missionary to the Americas.

Biography
He was born at Inca on the Island of Majorca, son of Pere Antoni Paieres  and Gerònima Borràs and joined the Franciscan order. He received the habit of St. Francis at Palma on September 5, 1784, and left Spain in February 1793 to attend the missionary College of San Fernando de Mexico, which trained missionaries for the work among the indigenous populations. Once there, he worked at the following missions:

 Mission San Carlos Borromeo de Carmelo (1796–1798)
 Mission Nuestra Señora de la Soledad (1798–1803)
 Mission San Diego de Alcalá (1803–1804)
 Mission La Purísima Concepción (1804–1823)

When Father Tápis retired in 1812, Father Payéras was elected Father-President of the California mission chain, holding the office from July, 1815 to April, 1820. During his tenure, Father Tápis directed the founding of Mission San Antonio de Pala (Pala Asistencia) in 1816, Mission San Rafael Arcángel in 1817, Santa Ysabel Asistencia in 1818, and the San Bernardino Asistencia, founded in 1819. During the same period, Father Payéras held the office of vicario foraneo of the Bishop of Sonora, to whose jurisdiction California belonged. In 1819 the College of San Fernando elected him Comisario-Prefecto of the missions, in which capacity he, at various times, visited the twenty missions then existing from San Diego to San Rafael, a distance of more than six hundred miles.

The zealous prelate also headed various expeditions to the territory of the savages for the purpose of finding suitable sites for new missions. Six months before his death he accompanied an expedition to the Russian settlements in the wilds of Sonoma County, and thereby most probably hastened his demise. In 1819, Father Payéras received the thanks of the King of Spain for his services during the Bouchard revolt. While in charge of Mission La Purísima Concepción he compiled a catechism in the language of the Indians, which was put to use but never published. "There was no friar of better and more evenly balanced ability," says American historian and ethnologist Hubert Howe Bancroft. "It was impossible to quarrel with him. He had extraordinary business ability, was a clear and forcible, as well as voluminous writer, and withal a man of great strength of mind and firmness of character."

See also

References

1769 births
1823 deaths
People of Alta California
Roman Catholic missionaries in Mexico
Spanish Franciscans
Priests of the Spanish missions in California
Spanish Roman Catholic missionaries
People from Inca, Mallorca
Roman Catholic missionaries in New Spain